Bragg Creek Provincial Park is a Canadian provincial park in Alberta's Rocky Mountains at the eastern edge of Kananaskis Country.  This park is located near the Elbow River and includes facilities for picnicking, hiking, and fishing.

CBC's television series North of 60 featured this provincial park as part of its principal filming photography.

This park lies at the intersection of Cowboy Trail and Highway 66, south of Bragg Creek in Rocky View County.

See also
List of provincial parks in Alberta
List of Canadian provincial parks
List of National Parks of Canada

External links

 Bragg Creek Provincial Park information

Rocky View County
Provincial parks of Alberta